Brassylic acid is an organic compound with chemical formula .  A white solid, it is the C13-dicarboxylic acid.  It is prepared by oxidation of erucic acid, which is abundant in some seed oils. Pelargonic acid is the coproduct.  In the industrial setting, brassylic acid is used to produce specialty nylons, e.g. nylon 1313.

References

Dicarboxylic acids